Classic Queen is a 1992 compilation album by the British rock band Queen. The album is seen as a US version of Greatest Hits II and was issued to capitalise on the renewed popularity of Queen in the United States following the release of the movie Wayne's World and the death of Freddie Mercury. The album reached number four on the US Billboard 200 and is certified three times platinum in the US and five times platinum in Canada.
Accumulated sales (Greatest Hits II and Classic Queen for the US and Canada combined) are in excess of 25 million worldwide.

Content and release
Although well received, Classic Queen did not fit in with the previous Queen compilations. Its track listing overlapped with both the 1981 Greatest Hits and the 1991 import Greatest Hits II albums and contained a few tracks not found on either of the previous releases. To remedy this situation, Hollywood Records re-released Greatest Hits six months later in 1992 in the US only, containing two different tracks from the UK edition. This was an effort to make it a companion collection with Classic Queen. The two compilations had near-identical covers, with Greatest Hits having a red background, while Classic Queen had royal blue. As the two were seen as counterparts, many of Queen's biggest hits which had appeared on Greatest Hits were left off Classic Queen, such as "Another One Bites the Dust", "We Will Rock You", "We Are the Champions", "Somebody to Love" and "Don't Stop Me Now".

There is also a video cassette version of the album released (modelled after the Greatest Flix II video), but long out of print.  It contained the 'Wayne's World' version of "Bohemian Rhapsody", plus newly-created videos for "Stone Cold Crazy", "One Year Of Love" and "Keep Yourself Alive".

Track listing

Personnel
Freddie Mercury – lead, backing and operatic vocals, synthesizer, piano, organ, sampler, keyboard, handclaps, finger snaps
Brian May – electric, acoustic and slide guitar, co-lead vocals on "I Want It All", "Keep Yourself Alive" (bridge), and "Who Wants to Live Forever", operatic and backing vocals, synthesizer, sampler, piano, keyboards, programming, drum programming, handclaps, finger snaps, orchestral arrangements (except on "One Year of Love")
Roger Taylor – acoustic and electric drums, drum machine, timpani, gong, tambourine, maracas, bar chimes, cowbell, co-lead vocals on "Keep Yourself Alive" (bridge), backing and operatic vocals, synthesizer, vocoder, sampler, keyboards, handclaps, finger snaps
John Deacon – bass guitar, handclaps, finger snaps, synthesizer, sampler, drum programming (except on "Who Wants to Live Forever")

Additional personnel
David Bowie – co-lead vocals, synthesizer, handclaps and finger snaps on "Under Pressure"
Fred Mandel – synthesizer on "Hammer to Fall" and "Radio Ga Ga"
Steve Gregory – saxophone on "One Year of Love"
Lynton Naiff – string arrangements on "One Year of Love"
David Richards – keyboards, percussion and programming on "These Are The Days of Our Lives"
Michael Kamen – orchestral arrangements and conducting on "Who Wants to Live Forever"
National Philharmonic Orchestra – strings, brass and percussion on "Who Wants to Live Forever"

Charts

Weekly charts

Year-end charts

Certifications

References

Queen (band) compilation albums
1992 greatest hits albums
Hollywood Records compilation albums